Establishment Day may refer to:

 The Hong Kong Special Administrative Region Establishment Day (July 1)
 The Macau Special Administrative Region Establishment Day (December 20)